The Reverend Honorable Solomon Lombard (17021781) was elected to the Massachusetts General Court in 1765. Lombard Esq. was an Agent to the Boston Convention in 1768, a Representative to the Massachusetts Provincial Congress in 1774, a Representative to the Great and General Court at Salem, Massachusetts in 1774 and a Judge of the Massachusetts Court of Common Pleas from 1776 to 1781.

An oldest son, Solomon Lombard was born April 5, 1702 in Truro, Maine (then Massachusetts). A 1723 Harvard University graduate, he came from Truro to marry Sarah Purington in 1724.  They settled in Gorham, Maine 1751. He was called to preach there by the town proprietors the previous year. Rev. Lombard was the first settled clergyman in Gorham. A part of the block house was fitted for public worship where he ministered for about a dozen years. He had several children. His sons, Solomon and Richard had large families.

A Gorham town meeting was held March 12, 1765. Officers elected included Surveyors of Lumber, and Lot layers. They voted Solomon Lombard, Esq. to serve for, and represent, Gorham at the Massachusetts Great Court, convened in Boston July 17, 1766.

As early as September 1768 a Gorham town meeting was held, and Solomon Lombard, Esq. (the former Pastor) was chosen "An agent to go to Boston, as soon as may be, to join a Convention of agents from other towns in the Province, to consult and resolve upon such measures as may most conduce to the safety and welfare of the inhabitants of this Province at this alarming and critical cuncture." Mr. Lombard was allowed eight days for going to, and returning from Boston They kept up an able, active, and vigorous Committee of Correspondence, composed of men of wisdom, sagacity and firmness."

Instructions to Solomon Lombard Esq. included: "Whereas you are chosen by the Town of Gorham to represent at a Great and General Court, or Assembly to be held at Salem, on Wednesday, the fifth day of October next. We desire you to observe the following instructions: That you use your endeavors to obtain a vote of the House, for the re-establishment of the former Charter of this Province. We instruct you to join with other members, which compose said Court, in forming themselves into a Provincial Congress in order to secure them in the enjoyment of their Charter, and Constitutional Rights of Freemen, and as Christians.

He was a Gorham Town Selectman in 1772. Also the town’s first  Representative to the Massachusetts General Court. Reelected four times.

Lombard attended the Provincial Congress in 1774, chairman of the committee of safety, and was active in the cause of the colonies in the war of the Revolution. He was among the most earnest in resisting the policy and acts of Parliament toward the Colonies.

While the town of Gorham was a part of Massachusetts it had four Judges of the Court of Common Pleas (1776 to 1781). Solomon Lombard was chosen to be one of these in 1776.

Lombard died in 1781, aged 79 years.

References

 McClellan, Hugh D. (1903). History of Gorham, Maine. Smith & Sales, Portland, Maine & Picton Press, Camden, Maine. Compiled and edited by his daughter Katherine B. Lewis. P. 632, 633.
 Whitman, Charles F. (1924). Norway, Maine, A History from the earliest settlements to the close of year 1922. Lewiston Journal Company, Norway, Maine. p. 457, 458.
 Pierce, Josiah (1862). History of the Town of Gorham, Maine. Foster & Cushing; and Bailey & Noyes. Portland, Maine. p. 92, 110, 118, 119, 120 184, 228, 232.
 NEHGS (1852). NEHGS Register, Vol. 6, Boston, MA.p. 376.
 King, Marquis (1991). Records of Gorham, ME. Picton Press, Camden, ME. P. 15, 16, 17, 181.
 Farmer, John.  Genealogical Register of the First Settlers of New-England. (Reprinted with additions and corrections by Samuel G. Drake. P. 181.
 Little, George Thomas. (1909). Genealogical and Family History of the State of Maine (compiled under the editorial supervision of George Thomas Little). Lewis Historical Publishing Company, New York. Volume IV, p. 2077.

1702 births
1781 deaths
Harvard University alumni
People of colonial Massachusetts
Politicians from Gorham, Maine
Maine city council members